Gorgan University of Agricultural Sciences and Natural Resources, a.k.a. Gorgan University is a university in Golestan Province of Iran.

History
GUASNR First founded in 1957 as the Junior College of Forestry and Range Management (مدرسه عالي منابع طبيعي گرگان), the university was among the first specialized agricultural universities of Iran. Through a course of continued development, the Junior College was promoted to the school of Natural Resources offering three major courses in Forestry, Range Management and Soil Conservation in 1975. After Islamic revolution, the School of Natural Resources was joined to the Ministry of Science, Research and Technology in 1981 and became part of the Mazandaran University. 
In 1986, the school was united with Junior College of Agriculture in the town of Gonbad and obtained an approval from the Council of Academic Development of the Ministry of Science, Research and Technology, to upgrade to an independent institute called Gorgan University Complex of Agricultural Sciences and Natural Resources. As a result of the hard work of the academic members and administrative staff, Council of Academic Development passed an approval based on which the complex was promoted to the Gorgan University of Agricultural Sciences and Natural Resources (GUASNR) on June 25, 1992.

Today the university has 9 Colleges (Faculties), training 2800 graduate and post-graduate students. The university has an exchange student program with Astrakhan State University in neighbouring Russia.

The university is located in the historical city of Gorgan in the Golestan Province (formerly the eastern part of Mazandaran province).

Amir Hossein Amirpour (Voice Actor and Artist) born 2000, were student at this university as Furniture's Industrie's Engineering field. but he had to leave this university. Because he was needed to studying computer engineering field. Now he is student of Computer Engineering field at Gorgan Hakim Jurjani Non-Governmental University.

Faculties
 Animal Science
 Agricultural Management
 Fisheries & Environmental Sciences
 Food Science & Technology
 Forest Science
 Plant Production
 Rangeland & Watershed Management
 Water & Soil Engineering
 Wood & Paper Engineering

Journals
 Iranian journal of Aquatics Research
 International Journal of Lignocellulosic Products
 International Journal of Plant Production
 International Journal of Environmental Resources Research
 Poultry Science Journal
 Journal of Natural Resource Conservation (Persian)
 Electronic Journal of Crop Production (Persian)
 Journal of Ruminant Research (Persian)
 Journal of Range Land (Persian)
 Poultry Science Journal (Persian)
 Journal of Soil Management and Sustainable Production (Persian)
 Journal of Entrepreneurship & Agricultural Extension (Persian)
 Journal of Plant Production (Persian)
 Journal of Food Processing and Preservation (Persian)
 Journal of Aquaculture (Persian)
 Journal of Living in Environment (Persian)
 Journal of Wood Science and Technology (Persian)

See also

Higher education in Iran

External links
Gorgan University website 

Universities in Iran
Educational institutions established in 1957
Buildings and structures in Golestan Province
Education in Golestan Province
1957 establishments in Iran